Alvin Hewlett (born Feb 3, 1952) is a former politician in Newfoundland. He represented Green Bay in the Newfoundland House of Assembly from 1989 to 1996.

The son of Clifford Hewlett, he was born in Port Anson and was educated at Memorial University. Hewlett was executive assistant and then chief of staff for Brian Peckford.

Hewlett was elected to the Newfoundland assembly in 1989 and was reelected in 1993. He was defeated by Graham Flight when he ran for election in the newly created district of Windsor-Springdale.

References 

Progressive Conservative Party of Newfoundland and Labrador MHAs
Living people
1937 births